Jaume Grau Ciscar (born 5 May 1997) is a Spanish professional footballer who plays as a midfielder for Zaragoza, on loan from CA Osasuna.

Club career
Born in Tavernes de la Valldigna, Valencian Community, Grau joined Real Madrid's youth setup in 2013, from Valencia CF. On 22 July 2016, after finishing his formation, he was loaned to Segunda División B side CDA Navalcarnero, for one year.

Grau made his senior debut on 21 August 2016, playing the last 14 minutes in a 2–0 home win against SD Amorebieta. The following July, after contributing with 25 appearances during the campaign, he returned to Los Blancos and was assigned to the reserves also in the third division; on 20 October 2017, he extended his contract until 2019.

On 9 July 2019, Grau signed a three-year contract with La Liga side CA Osasuna, and was immediately loaned to CD Lugo in Segunda División for the season. He made his professional debut on 17 August, starting in a 0–0 home draw against Extremadura UD.

On 24 August 2020, Grau moved abroad with Primeira Liga side C.D. Tondela, after agreeing to a one-year loan deal. Upon returning, he made his debut in the Spanish top tier on 18 September 2021, replacing Darko Brašanac in a 2–0 away win over Deportivo Alavés.

On 19 January 2022, Grau signed a three-and-a-half-year contract with Real Zaragoza in the second division.

Career statistics

Club

References

External links
Real Madrid profile

1997 births
Living people
Spanish footballers
Footballers from the Valencian Community
Association football midfielders
La Liga players
Segunda División players
Segunda División B players
Real Madrid Castilla footballers
CDA Navalcarnero players
CA Osasuna players
CD Lugo players
Real Zaragoza players
Primeira Liga players
C.D. Tondela players
Spanish expatriate footballers
Spanish expatriate sportspeople in Portugal
Expatriate footballers in Portugal